Alex O'Brien and Jared Palmer were the defending champions but only O'Brien competed that year with Justin Gimelstob.

Gimelstob and O'Brien lost in the first round to Marius Barnard and Jim Thomas.

Martin Damm and David Prinosil won in the final 7–6(7–5), 6–3 against Bob Bryan and Mike Bryan.

Seeds
The top four seeded teams received byes into the second round.

Draw

Final

Top half

Bottom half

External links
 2001 Legg Mason Tennis Classic Doubles draw

2001 ATP Tour